Colonel Jasbir Singh Raina, AC (5 July 1955) is a retired Indian Army officer who was awarded India's highest peacetime gallantry award Ashoka Chakra for his gallant act in Operation Blue Star.

Early life
Raina was born on 5 July 1955 in Shimla in a Sikh family, the third among five brothers. His father Gyani Kartar Singh Raina who had to leave in the trauma of the 1947 partition, settled down in Shimla. A devout and upright man, he inculcated in his children the virtues of a principled way of life. Raina had his early education in the Sir Harcourt Butler School, Shimla and later passed out from the Central School, Shimla. He graduated from the Govt College, Shimla with a B Sc degree.

Military career
Raina was always keen to join the Army and worked towards this goal assiduously. On 3 September 1977, he received a short-service commission as a second lieutenant in the 10th Battalion, Brigade of the Guards, and was promoted lieutenant on 3 September 1979. On 3 September 1982, he transferred to a permanent commission as a second lieutenant (seniority from 1 May 1978, seniority for pay from 3 September 1977) and was promoted to lieutenant with effect from the same date (seniority from 1 May 1980). He played all games for the battalion and reached the Command level in cross country, athletics and hockey. He was promoted to captain on 1 May 1984, and later that year, his battalion moved to Amritsar for taking part in Operation Blue Star.

Operation Blue Star
On 3 June 1984 during Operation Blue Star. IC- 37068, Captain Jasbir Singh Raina of 10 Guards was assigned the task of finding out details of the fortifications made by the militants in a building complex. Even though it was a dangerous mission, Captain Raina undertook the task and went inside in civilian clothes. In spite of the fact that he was being trailed by the militants throughout this mission, Capt Raina carried out the task at great risk to his own life and brought very useful information about the layout of the building as well as the fortifications inside it, Again on the night of the 5/6 June 1984, B' Company under command of Capt Jasbir Singh Raina was asked to flush out militants from a religious place. His company was the first to enter the complex and he was in the lead. His company's objective consisted of three storeyed buildings dominated from top, some underground tunnels and basements. As soon as the leading platoon entered the complex through the main entrance, it came under heavy fire of Light Machine Guns and other automatic weapons from all sides of the complex. Undaunted by the risk to his personal safety, Capt Raina forged ahead through intense fire of automatic weapons and inspired his men to maintain the momentum of the operation despite heavy casualties. With a resolute determination Capt Jasbir Singh Raina kept moving ahead inspiring his company to clear room after room occupied by the militants. While doing so, Captain Raina was hit on his knees by a burst of fire from point blank range and was seriously wounded. Despite the serious injury, he continued to rally his company and led his troops till he slumped due to excessive loss of blood. By then the mission had been finally accomplished. The officer even at this stage had to be evacuated much against his wishes. His bravery and inspiring leadership played a very major part in the success of his company's mission, which it achieved in spite of very heavy casualties.

Ashoka Chakra awardee
Captain Jasbir Singh Raina thus displayed most conspicuous bravery, inspiring leadership, cool courage and devotion to duty of an exceptionally high order. For his gallant act he was awarded Ashoka Chakra.

Later career
Raina was promoted major on 1 May 1989. He retired a full colonel on 3 April 2000.

References

1955 births
Indian Army personnel
Living people
People from Shimla